The 2018–19 FIS Cross-Country World Cup was the 38th official World Cup season in cross-country skiing for men and women. The season began on 24 November 2018 in Ruka, Finland and concluded with the World Cup Final on 24 March 2019 in Quebec City, Canada.

The biennial World Championships in Seefeld, Austria interrupted the World Cup in mid-February.

Calendar

Men

Women

Men's team

Women's team

Men's standings

Overall

Distance

Sprint

Prize money

Helvetia U23

Audi e-tron Bonus Ranking

Women's standings

Overall

Distance

Sprint

Prize money

Helvetia U23

Audi e-tron Bonus Ranking

Nations Cup

Overall

Men

Women

Points distribution 
The table shows the number of points won in the 2018/19 Cross-Country Skiing World Cup for men and ladies.

Achievements 

Only individual events.

First World Cup career victory

Men
  Janosch Brugger, 21, in his 3rd season – the WC 3 (15 km C Pursuit) in Lillehammer; also first podium
  Evgeniy Belov, 28, in his 9th season – the WC 6 (15 km F) in Davos; first podium was 2013-14 WC 17 (15 km C Mass Start) in Szklarska Poręba

Women
  Yuliya Belorukova, 23, in her 5th season – the WC 1 (Sprint C) in Ruka; first podium was 2017–18 WC 1 (Sprint C) in Ruka
  Jonna Sundling, 23, in her 5th season – the WC 3 (Sprint F) in Lillehammer; first podium was 2017–18 WC 18 (Sprint F) in Falun
  Natalya Nepryayeva, 23, in her 6th season – the WC 7 (10 km F) in Toblach; first podium was 2017–18 WC 15 (10 km C) in Lahti

First World Cup podium

Men
  Janosch Brugger, 21, in his 3rd season - no. 1 in the WC 3 (15 km C Pursuit) in Lillehammer
  Erik Bjornsen, 27, in his 7th season - no. 3 in the WC 3 (15 km C Pursuit) in Lillehammer
  Andrey Melnichenko, 26, in his 4th season - no. 3 in the WC 4 (30 km F) in Beitostølen
  Erik Valnes, 22, in his 2nd season - no. 3 in the WC 8 (Sprint F) in Dresden

Women
  Ebba Andersson, 21, in her 3rd season - no. 3 in the WC 2 (10 km C) in Ruka
  Anastasia Sedova, 23, in her 3rd season - no. 3 in the WC 7 (10 km F) in Toblach
  Sandra Ringwald, 28, in her 9th season - no. 2 in the WC 13 (Sprint F) in Cogne
  Johanna Hagström, 20, in her 3rd season - no. 3 in the WC 13 (Sprint F) in Cogne
    Nadine Fähndrich, 23, in her 4th season - no. 2 in the WC 14 (10 km C) in Cogne

Victories in this World Cup (all-time number of victories in parentheses)

Men
  Johannes Høsflot Klæbo, 13 (27) first places
  Alexander Bolshunov, 5 (8) first places
  Sjur Røthe, 3 (4) first places
  Federico Pellegrino, 2 (13) first places
  Sergey Ustiugov, 1 (13) first place
  Maurice Manificat, 1 (10) first place
  Alex Harvey, 1 (8) first place
  Emil Iversen, 1 (6) first place
  Didrik Tønseth, 1 (3) first place
  Iivo Niskanen, 1 (3) first place
  Sindre Bjørnestad Skar, 1 (2) first place
  Evgeniy Belov, 1 (1) first place
  Janosch Brugger, 1 (1) first place

Women
  Therese Johaug, 11 (53) first places
  Stina Nilsson, 8 (23) first places
  Ingvild Flugstad Østberg, 5 (16) first places
  Maiken Caspersen Falla, 3 (19) first places
  Jessie Diggins, 1 (6) first place
  Kerttu Niskanen, 1 (2) first place
  Yuliya Belorukova, 1 (1) first place
  Natalya Nepryayeva, 1 (1) first place
  Jonna Sundling, 1 (1) first place

Retirements
The following athletes announced their retirements during or after the season:

Men
 Robin Duvillard
 Alex Harvey
 Matti Heikkinen
 Nikita Kryukov
 Petter Northug
 Luis Stadlober
 Len Väljas
 Maxim Vylegzhanin

Women
 Stefanie Böhler
 Nicole Fessel
 Coraline Hugue
 Ida Ingemarsdotter
 Sandra Ringwald
 Ida Sargent
 Elisabeth Schicho
 Nathalie von Siebenthal

Footnotes

References 

 
FIS Cross-Country World Cup seasons
2018 in cross-country skiing
2019 in cross-country skiing